T2: Kontrakultur is the debut studio album by Swedish hip hop artist Timbuktu. In 2001, a new version of the album was released, containing only the Swedish songs plus a few bonus songs.

Track listing

Disc 1

Disc 2

Charts

References

2000 albums
Timbuktu (musician) albums